Abbadi or Abbadids (Arabic : بنو عباد) is  a prominent Arab Muslim dynasty, and one of the largest Arab tribes whose genealogy can be traced back to the Qahtanian "Qahtan" (Arabic : قحطانيون)   Judham (Arabic : جذام) tribe. Judham tribe has been historically documented to have inhabited regions in the Arab Levant and Saudi Arabia, and many researchers posit that Prophet Shuaib belonged to this same Tribe. Abu Ubaid al-Bakri, an erudite Andalusian Arab geographer, writer, polymath, and botanist born in 1030 AD, expounded on the subject, stating that Prophet Shuaib hailed from the Judham tribe and is recognized as the sons-in-law of Prophet Moses.

The Abbadi dynasty was most renowned for its rule over Seville and the surrounding areas during the 11th century, where it oversaw a period of exceptional cultural and scientific progress. This era was marked by significant advancements in literature, philosophy, and the arts, all of which were made possible by the Abbadi's patronage of scholars and artists. Under the Abbadi's enlightened rule, Seville became a center of intellectual and artistic innovation, drawing scholars and artists from across the world. This period of cultural and scientific flourishing not only produced lasting works of literature and art, but it also left an indelible mark on the region's history and cultural identity. The Abbadi dynasty's contribution to the cultural heritage of Islamic Spain, and particularly to the cultural legacy of Andalusia, remains a crucial chapter in the history of the region, and a testament to the enduring influence of Islamic civilization.

The Abbadi name currently holds the distinction of being the second most common surname in Jordan, where their presence is estimated at half a million people. Nevertheless, due to the early Islamic conquests, the influence of the Abbadi dynasty was widespread and far-reaching across multiple Arab nations, including Egypt, several North African countries, and eventually the region of Spain known as Andalusia. In which three generations of Abbadi khilafa, established the Kingdom of Seville in Andalusia. , a cultural and scientific hub which has had a lasting impact on the region's history.

Abbadi in Spain 
During the tumultuous period following the fall of the Umayyad Caliphate in Andalusia in 1031 AD, a new era began known as "The Kings of the Taifas." In this time of uncertainty, the people of Seville and the wider Andalusian region turned to Abu al-Qasim Muhammad ibn Abbad, also known as Abbad I, a respected judge from the Abbad tribe to lead them through the crisis. Abbad I was renowned for his sharp intellect, vast knowledge, and impartiality, which made him a trusted figure among the people of Andalusia. 

According to Abu Rafi’ al-Fadl bin Ali bin Ahmad bin Hazm book “Al-Hadi to Ma’rifat al-Abbadi Lineage”: He is Abu al-Qasim Muhammad bin Dhu al-Wazaratein Abi al-Walid Ismail bin Muhammad bin Ismail bin Quraish bin Abbad Bin Amr bin Aslam bin Amr bin Ataf bin Naeem. Ibn Hayyan has praised him for his virtuous rule. Ibn Hayyan notes that Ismail was considered one of the best Muslim rulers in Andalusia at that time due to his philanthropic nature. Ismail was known to spend his own money on public welfare and never collected a single dirham from the Sultan's treasury or from his servants. In addition to his generosity, Ismail was also known for his intellectual prowess, vast knowledge, and humble attitude. He was admired for his shrewdness and farsightedness, which enabled him to take wise decisions for the betterment of his people. Ismail's benevolent rule and dedication to the welfare of his people earned him a place in the annals of Andalusian history as a just and virtuous ruler. 

Abu al-Qasim Muhammad ibn Abbad ascended to the throne of Seville in the years spanning 1023 to 1042. His son, Al-Mu'tadid Ibn Abbad, or Abbad II, succeeded him in 1042 and under his reign, Seville emerged as the dominant kingdom in southern Spain. Subsequently, in 1069, the third and final ruler of the Abbadis, Al-Mutam'd ibn Abbad, or Abbad III, succeeded his father. Al-Mutam'd was a patron of the arts, a lover of Arabic Islamic architecture, and a skilled poet. In fact, Ibn al-Abar noted that he was a virtuous, brave, wise, generous, and trustworthy king. Under the reign of Al-Mutam'd, the kingdom of Seville expanded to include Cordoba, historic caliphate territories, Green Island, and Murcia.

However, following the decline of Andalusia and the Islamic Caliphate, the Abbadi dynasty was forced to flee and relocated to various countries in their journey back to their homeland in the Arab Levant, particularly Jordan. Meanwhile, those who remained in Spain were compelled to convert to Christianity. As a consequence, the Abbadi dynasty's surname can be found in a variety of countries, including North Africa, Egypt, Iraq, and elsewhere.

Meaning of Abbadi in Arabic 
The word Abbadi عّباديّ is derived from the Arabic word ْعَبّاد, which refers to a devoted worshiper of God , or a person who worships God devotionally and  continuously. The surname can be found nowadays written as العبادي or Al Abbadi.

Abbadi in Jordan 
The Abaddi dynasty held a formidable grip on Jordan, with its heartland centered in Amman and spread across ten governorates, including Balqa, Salt, Jerash, Ajloun, Irbid, Mafraq, Zarqa, Madaba, and Karak. The tribe's territorial expansion was hard-won, punctuated by brutal intertribal battles in the 18th and 19th centuries, resulting in territorial gains or losses.  The tribe's power and reach were immortalized in Jordanian poetry, with the oft-repeated phrase "Abbad from Stream to Stream," attesting to the breadth of their domain extending from the Zarqa River to Al Bahath stream, an indelible testament to their political and military might.

Historian Rox Bin Zaid Al-Azizi, in his book, A Landmark for Jordanian Heritage , noted that the Abbadi tribe is classified into two main groupings : Al-Jarūmiyyah and the Jabūriyyah.

Al-Jarūmiyyah includes Abbadi clans between the Zarqa torrent to the Wadi Shuaib stream, which is Al-Ardah area, Ayra, Al-Bireh, Yarqa, Wadi Shuaib, Jalad, Al-Rumaymin, and parts of the Jordan Valley, such as Maadi, the Jordan Valley, Damia Valley, Al-Malaha, and part of the Deir Alla area.

Al-Jabūriyyah includes Abbadi clans between the torrent of Wadi Shuaib to Wadi Al-Shita’, Marj Al-Hamam, Al-Bahat, Bayader, Wadi Al-Seer, Wadi Al-Seer, Al-Bassa, Iraq Al-Amir, Wadi Al-Shita’, Abu Al-Sus, Badr Al-Jadida, Mahes, Bilal, Umm Al-Aswad, Dabouq, Al-Rabahiya, and parts of Khalda.

The Al-Jarūmiyyah are divided into several clans:
 Al Hajjahja 
 Al Hawarith
 Al Kataleen
 Al Ramadnah
 AI Isalamah
 Al Sanabrah
 Al Maadat
 Al Ganayim
 Al Manaseer
 Al Naimat
 Al Yazagin

The Al-Jabūriyyah are also divided into several clans:

 Al Ibgour
 Al Salahin
 Al Ziyadat
 Al Karabah
 Al Tawahya
 Al Alwan
 Al Awamrah
 Al Mahasna
 Al Rahma
 Al Jirah
 Al Fiqaha
Note that each of these Clans is further subdivided into multiple surnames.

Queen Elizabeth Fake Links To both Prophet Muhammad & Al-Mutam'd ibn Abbad 
Following the passing of Queen Elizabeth II, a series of unfounded rumors emerged that attempted to connect her lineage to the Prophet Muhammad through Al-Mutam'd ibn Abbad, the former ruler of Seville. These rumors were falsely fabricated by a group of Spanish historians in the past, and gained public attention only recently, thanks to prominent newspapers and public figures, including the Daily Mail.

Regrettably, the Daily Mail published an inaccurate report claiming that Al-Mutam'd ibn Abbad had a daughter named Zaida making her a direct descendant of the Prophet Muhammad. However, this assertion is entirely false, as Al-Mutam'd ibn Abbad did not have a daughter named Zaida. Instead, Zaida was the wife of Al-Mutam'd's son, also known as "Al-Ma'mun," who ruled over Cordoba. Zaida, whose real name was Isabel, a young Castilian maid whom Al-Ma'mun married.

After the Islamic era in Spain came to an end, Zaida fled and wed Alfonso VI, the King of Castile. She eventually converted to Christianity or, more accurately, reverted to her previous faith. It is important to note that while Zaida's marriage to Al-Ma'mun was a matter of historical record, the claim that she was a direct descendant of the Prophet Muhammad is nothing more than a spurious rumor with no factual basis.

People with this surname 
Notable people include:

 Adi ibn Zayd. عدي بن زيد العبادي A 6th-century pre-Islamic poet.
 Abū ʿĀṣim Al-ʿAbbādī (d. 1066)
 Ibn Qāsim al-ʻAbbādī (d. 1585)
 Marouf al-Bakhit Al Abbadi (born 1947), Prime Minister of Jordan
 Hani Abbadi (died 2014), Jordanian politician
 Mamdouh Al Abbadi (born 1943) Jordanian Minister of Health
 Juma Abdullah Al Abbadi Jordanian diplomat
 Abd Al Salam Al Abbadi Minister of Awqaf Islamic Affairs and Holy Places in Jordan 
 Hussein AlShebli Al Abbadi Secretary General of Jordan Hashemite Charity Organization
 Ziad Manaseer Al Abbadi Jordanian-Russian entrepreneur and billionaire.
 Haider al-Abadi (born 1952) Prime Minister of Iraq
 Shirin Ebadi (born 1947) Nobel Peace Prize winner 
 Ilyas Abbadi (born 1992), Algerian boxer
 Mohammad Khtoom Al-Abadi (born 1950), Jordanian actor
 Mostafa El-Abbadi Egyptian historian (1928–2017)
 Amr El Abbadi Egyptian computer scientist (born 1958)

References

Bedouin groups